Oasis is a census-designated place in the California county of Riverside. The 2020 United States census reported Oasis's population was 4,468, down from 6,890 in 2010.

Geography
According to the United States Census Bureau, the CDP covers an area of 19.6 square miles (50.8 km), all of it land.

Demographics
At the 2010 census Oasis had a population of 6,890. The racial makeup of Oasis was 1,693 (24.6%) White, 22 (0.3%) African American, 96 (1.4%) Native American, 42 (0.6%) Asian, 0 (0.0%) Pacific Islander, 4,927 (71.5%) from other races, and 110 (1.6%) from two or more races. Hispanic or Latino of any race were 6,731 persons (97.7%).

The census reported that 6,885 people (99.9% of the population) lived in households, 5 (0.1%) lived in non-institutionalized group quarters, and no one was institutionalized.

There were 1,474 households, 1,129 (76.6%) had children under the age of 18 living in them, 968 (65.7%) were opposite-sex married couples living together, 193 (13.1%) had a female householder with no husband present, 165 (11.2%) had a male householder with no wife present.  There were 107 (7.3%) unmarried opposite-sex partnerships, and 17 (1.2%) same-sex married couples or partnerships. 93 households (6.3%) were one person and 23 (1.6%) had someone living alone who was 65 or older. The average household size was 4.67.  There were 1,326 families (90.0% of households); the average family size was 4.79.

The age distribution was 2,902 people (42.1%) under the age of 18, 893 people (13.0%) aged 18 to 24, 2,100 people (30.5%) aged 25 to 44, 795 people (11.5%) aged 45 to 64, and 200 people (2.9%) who were 65 or older.  The median age was 22.1 years. For every 100 females, there were 115.9 males.  For every 100 females age 18 and over, there were 120.9 males.

There were 1,575 housing units at an average density of 80.2 per square mile, of the occupied units 347 (23.5%) were owner-occupied and 1,127 (76.5%) were rented. The homeowner vacancy rate was 1.1%; the rental vacancy rate was 1.4%.  1,546 people (22.4% of the population) lived in owner-occupied housing units and 5,339 people (77.5%) lived in rental housing units.

References

Census-designated places in Riverside County, California
Census-designated places in California